In Defence of the Bush is a popular poem by Australian writer and poet Andrew Barton "Banjo" Paterson. It was first published in The Bulletin magazine on 23 July 1892 in reply to fellow poet Henry Lawson's poem, Up The Country. Paterson's rebuttal sparked the Bulletin Debate, a series of poems by both Lawson and Paterson about the true nature of life in the Australian bush.

In Up The Country, Lawson had criticised "The City Bushman" such as Banjo Paterson who tended to romanticise bush life. Paterson, in turn, accused Lawson of representing bush life as nothing but doom and gloom, famously ending with the line "For the bush will never suit you, and you'll never suit the bush."

See also

 1892 in poetry
 1892 in literature
 Australian literature

References 

1892 poems
Poetry by Banjo Paterson
Bulletin Debate
Works originally published in The Bulletin (Australian periodical)